Royal Sport Nautique de Gand, today named Koninklijke Roeivereniging Sport Gent (or KRSG), is a rowing club from Ghent, Belgium established in 1883 as the fourth Ghent-based club.

International successes
Rita Defauw has three silver (1986, 1987 and 1989) and one bronze (1990) medal(s) as well as a ninth place at the 1988 Olympic Games.

Frank Mangelschots has won a bronze medal in the double scull at the 1991 World Rowing Junior Championships

The highest ranking was achieved by Eveline Peleman, when she became world champion in the women's lightweight single scull in 2014. She also won a bronze medal at the World Rowing U23 Championships in the women's lightweight single scull that same year.

Ghent May regatta and Belgian International Open regatta
The club organises the annual Ghent May Regatta on the Watersportbaan in Ghent.

It should not be confused with the other Ghent-based regattas, such as the annual Spring Regatta in April, organised by the Gentse Roei- en Sportvereniging or the International Regatta KRC Ghent, which is organised in late September by Royal Club Nautique de Gand.

Henley Royal Regatta
The club was one of the first foreign winners of the famous Grand Challenge Cup.
The first winning crew was a combination with Royal Club Nautique de Gand and some years later an all-KRSG team managed to win it a second time. The most recent participations were in 1983 and 2008.

Notable members
The current president is Patrick Rombaut. Gwenda Stevens, vice president and youth coach, is also the current president of the Belgian Rowing Federation.

Victor "Fike" Uytterhaegen and Guido Terryn were the club's most successful coaches. Terryn most notably coached Rita Defauw, Wim Van Belleghem and the coxless pair made up of van Belleghem and Alain Lewuillon on an international level, as well as numerous other Belgium national teams.

Honours

Henley Royal Regatta

References

External links 
 KRSG Website (Dutch)
 International May Regatta
 KRSG on Facebook 

1883 establishments in Belgium
Sport in Belgium
Sport in Ghent
History of rowing
Rowing in Belgium
Rowing clubs in Belgium
Sports clubs established in 1883